Verrill Dana, LLP is a New England regional law firm. It has offices in Portland, Maine; Augusta, Maine; Westport, Connecticut; Boston, Massachusetts; Providence, Rhode Island; White Plains, New York; and Washington D.C. It has more than 120 lawyers in seven regional offices.

Verrill Dana was founded in 1862, and has grown into one of the few Maine-based law firms with satellite offices around the Northeastern United States. The firm provides legal services to both businesses and individuals.  Its major practice areas include: business law/M&A, health care, litigation and trial, real estate law, labor law and employment law, employee benefits and executive compensation, tax law, private equity, intellectual property and privacy, promotions, energy, environmental law, estate planning and family law, among others.

In August 2019, Verrill Dana rebranded as Verrill and launched a new website, www.verrill-law.com, and new logo.

In August 2013, Verrill Dana announced a merger with the trial boutique firm Friedman Gaythwaite Wolf, LLP. In 2015, Verrill Dana announced its combination with Levett Rockwood, a 19-attorney firm in Westport.

In 2007, partner John D. Duncan  was expelled from Verrill Dana for stealing $300,0000 from clients and the firm itself.  In May 2010 the Maine Board of Bar Overseers brought ethics charges against Verrill Dana for neglect of duty in protecting their clients.  In 2011, the Maine High Court denied the neglect of duty charges, but ruled that Verrill Dana had violated ethics rules by not closely monitoring Duncan after problems were first noticed in one account.

Honors and Distinctions 
Verrill Dana, LLP has continued to rank high in publications and directories, and its lawyers have achieved many honors and distinctions, including but not limited to:

 The majority of Verrill Dana, LLP attorneys have been reviewed and rated by Martindale-Hubbell, and 48 of the attorneys have achieved their top "AV" rating
 38 attorneys were recognized as Leading Lawyers by "Chambers USA, America's Leading Lawyers for Business" in 2014
 From 2008 - 2014, "Chambers USA, America's Leading Lawyers for Business" ranked Verrill Dana, LLP as a Leading Firm in all categories and sub-categories in which the firm was evaluated
 Nine attorneys were named Portland "Lawyers of the Year" by Best Lawyers for 2015 
 Six attorneys were named Portland "Lawyers of the Year" by Best Lawyers for 2014
 58 attorneys from 45 different practice areas have been recognized in the 2015 edition of "The Best Lawyers in America" 
 54 attorneys were named as "New England Super Lawyers" in 2013
 Verrill Dana, LLP has regularly been awarded for their pro bono work by the ME State Bar Association.
 65 Verrill Attorneys Recognized by Best Lawyers® 2022, Including Eight Named Lawyers of the Year.

Notable Attorneys 

 G. Steven Rowe - served with firm from 2009-2012, and ran for Governor of Maine in the 2010 election. He served as Maine Attorney General from 2001 to 2009 and as a member of the Maine House of Representatives from 1992 to 2000.
 Michael Saxl -  a firm lawyer and Maine Speaker of the House from 2001-2002, and Principal of Maine Street Solutions - Verrill Dana's public affairs and consulting affiliate 
 Frank M. Coffin - served as a partner and is now recognized for his work by the firm in the form of the Frank M. Coffin Fellowship in Family Law
  Howard H. Dana - served among the Justices of the Maine Supreme Judicial Court from 1993 - 2007
 Robert Hirshon - a current firm attorney and a former President of the American Bar Association.

References 

 Verrill Dana on The Best Lawyers
 Chambers and Partners Firm Profile
 Verrill Dana's Massachusetts Super Lawyers
 Verrill Dana's New England Super Lawyers
 Verrill Dana on Martindale

External links 
 Verrill Dana's Official Website

Law firms based in Maine
1862 establishments in Maine